Sitalkuchi  is a village and a gram panchayat in the Sitalkuchi CD block in the Mathabhanga subdivision of the Cooch Behar district  in the state of West Bengal, India.

Geography

Location

Area overview
The map alongside shows the western part of the district. In Mekhliganj subdivision 9.91% of the population lives in the urban areas and 90.09% lives in the rural areas. In Mathabhanga subdivision 3.67% of the population, the lowest in the district, lives in the urban areas and 96.35% lives in the rural areas. The entire district forms the flat alluvial flood plains of mighty rivers.

Note: The map alongside presents some of the notable locations in the subdivisions. All places marked in the map are linked in the larger full screen map.

Civic administration

Police station
Sitalkuchi police station has jurisdiction over Sitalkuchi CD block. It covers an area of 261.79 km2.

CD block HQ
The headquarters of the Sitalkuchi CD block are located at Sitalkuchi village.

Demographics
As per the 2011 Census of India, Sitalkuchi had a total population of 37,052.  There were 18,940 (51%) males and 18,112 (49%) females. There were 4,711 persons in the age range of 0 to 6 years. The total number of literate people in Sitalkuchi was 23,473 (72.58% of the population over 6 years).

Education
Sitalkuchi College was established in 1999. Affiliated with the  Cooch Behar Panchanan Barma University, it offers honours courses in Bengali, English, political science, history, geography and philosophy and a general course in arts.

Healthcare
Sitalkuchi Rural Hospital, with 30 beds at Sitalkuchi, is the major government medical facility in the Sitalkuchi CD block.

References

Villages in Cooch Behar district